The National Fund is a British charity whose purpose is to pay off the United Kingdom national debt in full. The value of the fund stood at £519,707,831 on 5 April 2019, an increase of £20.9 million on the year before.

The fund was set up in 1928 with a £500,000 anonymous donation. In 2019 the Government confirmed that it "does not hold information about the identity of the donor who set up the Fund." It has been suggested that the donor pledged the money as a response to a 1919 Financial Times editorial by then-Financial Secretary to the Treasury Stanley Baldwin, which suggested patriotic rich citizens voluntarily contribute towards paying the debt accumulated from World War I. In 2020 it was revealed in court documents that the anonymous benefactor who had bequeathed the original endowment was Gaspard Farrer, a former partner at the now-defunct Barings Bank. 

The value of the fund has risen steadily in recent years, having been £69,300,504 on 31 March 1989.

On 22 May 2018 an application was made to the High Court by the Attorney General for the release of the National Fund for the purposes of reducing the National Debt. An original court date set for November 2019 has been pushed back to October 2020. The charity's 2019 financial statements revealed that the reason for the delay was that just before the November 2019 trial someone came forward "claiming to be the original benefactor's great-great-nephew, arguing that the original charitable gift has failed and that the funds be distributed to the original donor's estate."

In answer to a parliamentary question asked in the House of Lords in June 2020 by Baroness Hayter of Kentish Town, government minister Lord Keen of Elie stated, "It is now for the High Court to determine the individual’s claims and decide whether the terms of the charitable trust should be varied as sought by the Attorney General. If the Attorney General’s application is successful the money in the fund will be paid over to the National Debt Commissioners towards the reduction of the national debt."

Court intervention is required because, under the terms of the fund, its value must be left to accumulate until such time as it is sufficient to pay off the National Debt in full. With the UK's National Debt standing at £1,891.8 billion in December 2019, the fund is equivalent less than 0.03 per cent of it, even though it has been accumulating for over 90 years. Indeed, in 2018 the UK Government, through a ministerial answer to a written parliamentary question, stated that, according to expert evidence, "there is no realistic prospect of the Fund ever amounting to a sum sufficient to pay off the whole of the National Debt."

Many alternative uses for the money held by the National Fund have been proposed, most recently that the money should be disbursed to help the voluntary sector respond to the demands of the coronavirus pandemic.

On 21 January 2022 the Chancery Division of the High Court of Justice handed down its judgment in H.M. Attorney General -v- Zedra Fiduciary Services (UK) Limited. Applying the cy-pres doctrine and considering competing cy-pres schemes from the Attorney General and from Zedra (the current trustees of the Fund), the court approved a scheme proposed by the Attorney General for England and Wales to amend the underlying trust deed to permit the balance of the Fund to be applied against the UK national debt. Under the scheme, it is envisaged that the Fund will be so applied on a date shortly after the court order giving effect to the judgment.

References

1928 establishments in England
United Kingdom national debt